We Bought a Zoo is a 2011 American family comedy-drama film loosely based on the 2008 memoir of the same name by Benjamin Mee. It was co-written and directed by Cameron Crowe and stars Matt Damon as widowed father Benjamin Mee, who purchases a dilapidated zoo with his family and takes on the challenge of preparing the zoo for its reopening to the public. The film also stars Scarlett Johansson, Maggie Elizabeth Jones, Thomas Haden Church, Patrick Fugit, Elle Fanning, Colin Ford, and John Michael Higgins.

We Bought A Zoo was released in the United States on December 21, 2011 by 20th Century Fox. The film earned $120.1 million on a $50 million budget. We Bought a Zoo was released on DVD and Blu-ray on April 3, 2012 by 20th Century Fox Home Entertainment.  Dartmoor Zoological Park (originally Dartmoor Wildlife Park), on which the film is based, is a 33-acre zoological garden located near the village of Sparkwell, Devon, England.

Plot
Benjamin Mee has been grieving the loss of his wife, Katherine, for seven months. When his 14-year-old son Dylan is expelled from school, Benjamin realizes that the family's current situation is not working, they are all grieving, and everything around them reminds them of Katherine. Benjamin decides to make a fresh start, starting with a new home. 

He tours many homes with his 7-year-old daughter, Rosie, and their realtor, Mr. Stevens, but find none to their liking until Rosie sees a listing for a large old house. Mr. Stevens tries to dissuade them from considering it, but as they tour the grounds, Benjamin declares that "it's perfect". Stevens explains that if they want the house, then they must also buy the zoo on the property which closed several years before. Benjamin, seeing Rosie playing happily with the peacocks, resolves to buy the zoo. 

Dylan, frustrated by the idea of moving away from his friends, retreats into his art. Benjamin's brother, Duncan, tries to discourage him from the purchase, but he buys it anyway.

The zoo staff, led by head keeper Kelly Foster, start making renovations to reopen the zoo to the public. When Kelly asks Benjamin why he bought the zoo despite knowing nothing about zoo management, he simply responds, "Why not?" Meanwhile, Dylan is very unhappy and misses his friends, causing him to retreat further into his art. He is soon befriended by Kelly's 13-year-old homeschooled cousin, Lily, who develops a crush on him.

Walter Ferris, a strict USDA inspector, arrives for a surprise visit and makes a list of repairs that would cost over $100,000. Benjamin cannot afford the repairs and gossip spreads that he will probably sell the zoo. The staff's morale sinks, fearing the property will be sold to a buyer that will close it down. Dylan is overjoyed when Lily tells him the rumor about his family leaving, which hurts her feelings. 

Benjamin learns that Katherine bequeathed him an investment account with instructions to use the money wisely while listening to his heart. Duncan advises him to walk away and start over with the money, but Benjamin decides to use the money for the repairs.

Dylan, unhappy about having to stay, confronts his father and they have a heated argument. They reconcile the next morning and Dylan admits he misses Lily. Benjamin tells Dylan his favorite motto: that you only need 20 seconds of courage for something great to happen. Benjamin realizes that instead of trying to start over by forgetting his wife, he should accept that she will always be a part of him. Dylan, following his father's advice, confesses his love to Lily, and she forgives him.

Prior to the zoo's grand opening, the facility passes a stringent inspection by Ferris, who grudgingly wishes them good luck. They learn that the worst rainstorm in 100 years may wash out the zoo's grand opening. Fortunately, the weather clears by the morning of the grand opening, but they are disappointed when it appears that no one is visiting.

Dylan discovers that a fallen tree has blocked the access road with a large crowd of visitors waiting behind it. The staff help everyone climb over the tree, and the attendance is so high that they run out of tickets. Benjamin and Kelly set out to find more and end up face to face in a shed, where Kelly admits that she has a crush on Benjamin and they kiss.

Benjamin takes Dylan and Rosie to the restaurant where he met Katherine. He tells them the story of how he worked up the nerve to approach her table with "20 seconds of insane courage." He visualizes her at the table, and asks why such an amazing woman would talk to someone like him. She responds, "Why not?"

Cast
 Matt Damon as Benjamin Mee, the father of Dylan and Rosie Mee, the owner of the zoo and the love interest of Kelly Foster, who is trying to restart his life after the death of his first wife, Katherine.
 Scarlett Johansson as Kelly Foster, the 28-year-old lead long-time zookeeper at Rosemoor Animal Park who is Benjamin's love interest and is a mother figure to Dylan and Rosie.
 Thomas Haden Church as Duncan Mee, Benjamin's older brother and an accountant and Dylan and Rosie's uncle
 Colin Ford as Dylan Mee, Benjamin's 14-year-old son, who is initially drawn to Lily and eventually develops feelings for her and has a strained and rough relationship with his father.
 Maggie Elizabeth Jones as Rosie Mee, Benjamin's 7-year-old daughter and Dylan's younger sister, who is very curious about all of the animals in the zoo and thinks living at a zoo is a grand adventure.
 Elle Fanning as Lily Miska, the 13-year old home-schooled cousin of Kelly and worker at the zoo's restaurant who lives within the zoo. Although she is too young to legally work, she is paid "under the table" out of her cousin's salary. She likes Dylan, who is at first unaware of this fact.
 Patrick Fugit as Robin Jones; the zoo's craftsman and Crystal the Monkey's owner.
 John Michael Higgins as Walter "Walt" Ferris, a strict zoo inspector who earns the dislike of many people, especially Peter MacCreedy.
 Angus Macfadyen as Peter MacCreedy, the carpenter of the zoo who had made many innovative enclosures for the zoo, and he claims that his ideas were "stolen" by Walter Ferris. Because of this, he has a huge and violent grudge against Walter.
 Carla Gallo as Rhonda Blair, the secretary and bookkeeper of the zoo.
 J. B. Smoove as Mr. Stevens, the Mee family's real estate agent.
 Stéphanie Szostak as Katherine Mee, the deceased wife of Benjamin Mee and mother of Dylan and Rosie Mee.
 Desi Lydic as Shea Seger, a woman with an obvious crush on Benjamin who always brings him lasagna.
 Peter Riegert as Delbert McGinty, Benjamin's boss before he 'starts over'.
 Michael Panes as the principal of Dylan and Rosie's school.
 Dustin Ybarra as Nathan
 Kym Whitley as Eve the Home Depot Clerk.
 Crystal the Monkey as herself.
 Bart / Tank the Bear as Buster, a grizzly bear.
 Taylor Cerza as Zoo Patron (credited as Taylor Victoria)

Production
The zoo scenes were filmed at Greenfield Ranch in Hidden Valley, Thousand Oaks, California, where a zoo was erected for the filming.

Development
In May 2010, Cameron Crowe agreed to direct the 20th Century Fox adaptation of Benjamin Mee's memoir We Bought a Zoo. He then began rewriting the film's script, which was originally written by Aline Brosh McKenna. This was the first narrative film that was directed by Crowe since the 2005 film Elizabethtown. The film was released on December 21, 2011.

Casting
Crowe traveled to the set of the film True Grit to persuade actor Matt Damon to take on the role of the lead character in the film. Crowe also presented a script of the film, a CD of songs that Crowe burned himself of live versions of classic songs, and a copy of the 1983 film Local Hero, with instructions "to not just read the script and make a decision". Damon was persuaded to play the role after he was moved by the music and found that Local Hero was a "masterpiece". As for Crowe himself, he had already decided on Damon halfway through their meeting, though the distributor Fox still had a shortlist of candidates to play this role.

Soundtrack
In August 2011, it was announced that Icelandic musician Jón Þór "Jónsi" Birgisson, the lead singer of the band Sigur Rós, would be composing the music scores for We Bought a Zoo. Director Crowe described the choice as "only natural", since "Jónsi has been a part of the making of We Bought A Zoo from the very beginning".

The song Gathering Stories was on the shortlist of 39 songs that have a chance of being nominated for Best Original Song Oscar at the 84th Academy Awards. This song was co-written by Jonsi Birgisson and Cameron Crowe.

While the official CD release of the movie soundtrack only includes music by Jón Þór "Jónsi" Birgisson and Sigur Rós, the complete soundtrack of the film included a variety of artists.

Track listing

Film tracks not on album
 "Don't Come Around Here No More" – Tom Petty and the Heartbreakers
 "Do It Clean" – Echo & the Bunnymen
 "Airline to Heaven" – Wilco
 "Don't Be Shy" – Cat Stevens
 "Living with the Law" – Chris Whitley
 "Last Medicine Dance" – Mike McCready
 "Buckets of Rain" – Bob Dylan
 "I'm Open" – Eddie Vedder
 "No Soy Del Valle" – Quantic Presenta Flowering Inferno
 "Like I Told You" – Acetone
 "Ashley Collective" – Mike McCready
 "For a Few Dollars More" – The Upsetters
 "Hunger Strike" – Temple of the Dog
 "Mariachi El Bronx" – Mariachi El Bronx
 "Haleakala Sunset" – CKsquared
 "Cinnamon Girl" (live) – Neil Young
 "Holocene" – Bon Iver
 "Throwing Arrows" – Mike McCready
 "Work to Do" – The Isley Brothers
 "All Your Love (I Miss Loving)" – Otis Rush
 "I Think It's Going to Rain Today" – Randy Newman

Reception

Box office
We Bought a Zoo grossed a total of $2,984,875 on its opening day in the U.S. box office, making it the sixth highest-grossing film that weekend. It subsequently earned $14,604,645 in its first four days of screening. Overall, the film grossed $75,624,550 in North America and $37,764,426 internationally for a worldwide total of $113,388,976. It is one of only twelve feature films to be released in over 3,000 theaters and still improve on its box office performance in its second weekend, increasing 41.4% from $9,360,434 to $13,238,241.

Critical response
On review aggregator website Rotten Tomatoes, the film has an approval rating of 65% based on 172 reviews, with an average rating of 6.20/10. The website's critical consensus reads, "We Bought a Zoo is a transparently cloying effort by director Cameron Crowe, but Matt Damon makes for a sympathetic central character." On Metacritic the film has a score of 58 out of 100, based on 40 critics, indicating "mixed or average reviews".

Roger Ebert, reviewing for the Chicago Sun-Times, awarded the film two and a half out of four stars, describing the film as "too much formula and not enough human interest". He added that the film's "pieces go together too easily, the plot is too inevitable, and we feel little real energy between the players". However, he praised Damon, who he said "makes a sturdy and likable Benjamin Mee". The New York Times reviewer Manohla Dargis criticized Crowe's direction, writing that it "makes the escalating tension between Benjamin and Dylan the story's soft center," while keeping "the brutality of illness and death... safely off-screen". She also noted that the film uses "classic movie logic", specifically pointing out the way that Benjamin quits his job and that he "doesn't agonize about how he'll keep his children housed, fed and clothed". On the other hand, Dargis wrote that "you may not buy his [Cameron's] happy endings, but it's a seductive ideal when all of God's creatures, great and small, buxom and blond, exist in such harmony.""

The Hollywood Reporter commented that the film "has heart, humanity and a warmly empathetic central performance from Matt Damon", although it "doesn't dodge the potholes of earnest sentimentality and at times overplays the whimsy"; ultimately concluding that "Cameron Crowe's film has some rough edges, but it ultimately delivers thanks to Matt Damon's moving performance.""

Home media
20th Century Fox Home Entertainment released We Bought a Zoo on DVD and Blu-ray on April 3, 2012.

Accolades

Differences between the movie and real life
The film's plot and actual events differ. The real Benjamin Mee is British, whereas in the film he is American. The story was adapted for an American audience and Mee approved the changes. The actual zoo Mee bought is Dartmoor Zoological Park, located in Devon, England. The fictional zoo in the film is called Rosemoor Wildlife Park and is located in California, US.

In real life, Benjamin's wife, Katherine, died after they had bought the zoo and moved in. In the film, Benjamin bought the zoo after her death. In real life, Benjamin's father had died and his mother needed to move; the farm cost the same price as his parents' house, and his mother came too. Benjamin and his family made a specific and informed decision to buy a zoo: in the film, it occurred as a result of finding a house they liked.

Instead of an escaping grizzly bear, as portrayed by the film, it was a jaguar called Sovereign that had escaped. Benjamin's children were also younger (aged four and six respectively) than the children in the film.

In the film, the zoo was much easier to buy. In real life, it took almost two years to buy. Benjamin's first offer to buy the zoo was rejected due to his lack of experience in the zoological world. Finally, the real zoo opened on Saturday 7 July 2007. The film moved that event to the same date in 2010. This later date fell on a Wednesday, but was identified in the script as the original Saturday.

Legacy 
The longtime gag-feud between Matt Damon and Oscars host Jimmy Kimmel continued at the 89th Academy Awards ceremony, where Kimmel jokingly mocked Damon's performance in the movie.

References

External links
 Dartmoor Zoological Park official website
 
 We Bought a Zoo at Rotten Tomatoes
 

2011 films
2011 comedy-drama films
20th Century Fox films
American comedy-drama films
Comedy-drama films based on actual events
Dune Entertainment films
Films about animal rights
Films about dysfunctional families
Films about grieving
Films about widowhood
Films based on biographies
Films directed by Cameron Crowe
Films produced by Cameron Crowe
Films set in California
Films set in zoos
Films shot in Los Angeles
Films with screenplays by Aline Brosh McKenna
Films with screenplays by Cameron Crowe
Vinyl Films films
2010s English-language films
2010s American films